Dieter Burdenski (born 26 November 1950) is a German former professional footballer who played as a goalkeeper.

Early and family life
Born in Bremen, Germany, Dieter Burdenski is the father of Fabian Burdenski (1991–) and the son of Herbert Burdenski (1922–2001), who was a German international himself. An outfield player, unlike his son, Herbert Burdenski was capped five times (two goals) by Sepp Herberger, playing just two of these five games after World War II. Converting a penalty in West Germany's first post-war international (against Switzerland on 22 November 1950), Dieter Burdenski's father became the first ever goalscorer for the Federal Republic of Germany.

Club career

Early career
Starting at STV Horst-Emscher, Burdenski joined FC Schalke 04 as a teenager to debut for the Gelsenkirchen outfit in three separate Bundesliga matches in the 1970–1971 season. One of those three, the 0–1 home defeat against Arminia Bielefeld on 17 April 1971, became later under scrutiny through the German Football Association in the match fixing Bundesligaskandal. Although Burdenski conceded the goal Bielefeld had paid Schalke 04 players for, Burdenski was able to satisfy court and the German Football Association that he was not deliberately involved in the fixing of matches. However the scandal had effects on his career. Seeking match practice, he joined scandal-shaken Arminia Bielefeld in 1971, serving as their first choice in goal until Arminia Bielefeld was punished for the clubs involvement in the scandal with relegation from the Bundesliga.

Werder Bremen
Burdenski moved on, signing for SV Werder Bremen with the trouble to wait one more season behind their first-choice Günter Bernard for his practice. From 1973 he succeeded Bernard, staying the regular in the goal of the North German outfit until Otto Rehhagel preferred young Oliver Reck over the then veteran shot-stopper ahead of the Bundesliga title winning campaign of Werder Bremen in 1987–88.

Making three final appearances for Werder in that season, Burdenski retired from the game in 1988 after 478 Bundesliga matches. His statistics, that also read 35 matches in the 2. Bundesliga in his Bremen years, feature one goal which Burdenski scored with a penalty in Bremen's 2–3 Bundesliga defeat against VfB Stuttgart in September 1979.

As Dieter Burdenski's father Herbert was also manager in the Bundesliga in the 1960s and 1970s, it came to happen that SV Werder Bremen brought the two Burdenski's together for the season of 1975–76. Dieter Burdenski played 22 of his 34 Bundesliga matches that season under the management of his father. In February 1976 Bremen, lying in a precarious position in the bottom-half of the Bundesliga then, sacked Herbert Burdenski to replace him with Otto Rehhagel.

Later career
Initially retired, AIK of Sweden and Dutch club Vitesse Arnhem managed to lure the popular goalkeeper, who was awarded the honorary captaincy of Werder Bremen in 2005, out of retirement. Burdenski played in one match for AIK in Allsvenskan (he had been in touch with the Swedish club due to him knowing AIK's Sanny Åslund after Åslund had been his teammate at Bremen in the 1975–76) and three games for Vitesse in the Dutch Eredivisie respectively.

On 23 February 2002, the then 51-year-old made a single appearance for SV Werder Bremen II in the third German division after injuries had seen the reserves ending up short of goalkeepers. Burdenski conceded three that afternoon with SV Werder Bremen II beaten 3–1 by league rivals Chemnitzer FC.

International career
Looking for decent goalkeepers to someday succeed ageing Sepp Maier in the West Germany goal, Helmut Schön turned his attention to the Werder Bremen man in 1977, handing Burdenski his first of altogether 12 caps in a friendly in Montevideo against Uruguay. He was taken with the squad to Argentina to be a benchwarmer at the 1978 FIFA World Cup, playing three times in the 1980 UEFA European Championship qualifiers (but missing out on making the 1980 UEFA European Championship squad of the West Germans), and was doing the same job on the substitution bench at the 1984 UEFA European Championship. Before that tournament he enjoyed his final appearance for his country, coming on at half-time in a friendly against Italy in Zürich on 22 May 1984.

Style of play
Not the tallest for a goalkeeper at 1.81 m, Burdenski was exceptionally athletic and a superb shot stopper with amazing reactions. Burdenski was also known for his leadership qualities, he was captain of Werder Bremen many times during his long career.

Coaching career
In 1997, Burdenski was re-signed by Werder Bremen for their coaching staff, working with the goalkeepers of the club until December 2005.

References

External links
  
 

1950 births
Living people
Footballers from Bremen
German footballers
Germany international footballers
Germany B international footballers
STV Horst-Emscher players
FC Schalke 04 players
Arminia Bielefeld players
SV Werder Bremen players
SV Werder Bremen II players
AIK Fotboll players
SBV Vitesse players
1978 FIFA World Cup players
UEFA Euro 1984 players
Eredivisie players
Bundesliga players
2. Bundesliga players
Allsvenskan players
Association football goalkeepers
German expatriate footballers
Expatriate footballers in Sweden
Expatriate footballers in the Netherlands
German expatriate sportspeople in Sweden
German expatriates in the Netherlands
West German footballers
West German expatriate footballers